COmputational Spectroscopy In Natural Sciences and Engineering (COSINE) is a Marie Skłodowska-Curie Innovative Training Network.
in the field of theoretical and computational chemistry, focused on Computational Spectroscopy. The developing of theoretical tools is the main goal of the projects: computational codes based on electronic structure theory for the investigation of organic photochemistry and for simulation of spectroscopic experiments. It is part of the framework programme funding research Horizon 2020

Objective 
Main purpose of the COSINE ETN is the development of ab-initio research tools to study optical properties and excited electronic states, which are dominated by electron correlation. This tools are developed for the investigation of organic photochemistry with the aim of accurate simulation of spectroscopic experiments on the computer. To this end a complementary series of tools, rooted in Coupled cluster, algebraic diagrammatic construction, Density Functional Theory, as well as selected multi-reference methods, are developed.

Nodes
The project is divided into 8 different nodes:

 Node 1, University of Heidelberg (UHEI) is the coordinating node, led by Andreas Dreuw;
 Node 2, KTH Royal Institute of Technology (KTH) in Stockholm, led by Patrick Norman;
 Node 3, Ludwig Maximilian University of Munich (LMU), led by Christian Ochsenfeld;
 Node 4, Scuola Normale Superiore (SNS) in Pisa, led by Chiara Cappelli;
 Node 5, University of Southern Denmark (SDU) in Odense, led by Jacob Kongsted;
 Node 6, L'École Nationale Supérieure de Chimie de Paris (ENSCP), led by Ilaria Ciofini:
 Node 7, Norwegian University of Science and Technology (NTNU) in Trondheim, led by Henrik Koch;
 Node 8, Technical University of Denmark (DTU) in Lyngby, led by Sonia Coriani.

Partner organisations 
 ELETTRA, Sincotrone Trieste, Italy;
Electromagnetic Geoservices ASA, Norway;
 EXACT LAB SRL, Italy;
 NVIDIA GmbH, Germany;
 DELL S.P.A., Italy;
 Inc., United States;
 PDC Center for High-Performance Computing, KTH, Sweden;
 Dipartimento di Scienze Chimiche e Farmaceutiche, Università degli Studi di Trieste, Italy.

References

External links 
 COSINE homepage
 ITN Marie Skłodowska-Curie actions
 CORDIS Community REsearch and Development Information Service

Computational chemistry